Sclerocrana is a genus of fungi in the family Sclerotiniaceae. This is a monotypic genus, containing the single species Sclerocrana atra.

References

External links
Index Fungorum

Sclerotiniaceae
Monotypic Ascomycota genera